The Case Concerning the Territorial Dispute (Libyan Arab Jamahiriya/Chad) [1994] is a public international law case decided by the International Court of Justice. The ICJ ruled in favor of Chad against Libyan Arab Jamahiriya and awarded sovereignty over Aouzou Strip to Chad.

Facts

The Aouzou Strip is a barren piece of land located on the border of Chad and Libya. Libya had begun to stage troops on the strip in order to assist with the defense of its citizens who lived in the area. Despite the land having no strategic or functional value to Chad, the government saw the Aouzou Strip as part of their sovereign territory. Due to the inability of both countries to internally establish a line of demarcation, the case was referred to the International Court of Justice for adjudication in 1990.

Each country has a differing basis from which it is deriving its claims of the Aouzou Strip:
 Libya's claim is on "the basis of a coalescence of rights and titles of the indigenous inhabitants, the Senoussi Order, the Ottoman Empire, and through an agreement that its government made with Italy." 
 Chad has argued that the border was established through the Treaty of Friendship and Good Neighborliness which was concluded between France and Libya in 1955. 

From Libya's perspective, there is not enough evidence to show that a boundary was ever established and that they have adequately lay claim to the Aouzou Strip through administrative control. Chad's use of the Treaty of Friendship and Good Neighborliness as basis of its claim has also been challenged due to the treaty being in effect for only 20 years (1955-1975).

Judgment

The International Court of Justice ruled that the boundary between Chad and Libya is defined by the Treaty of Friendship and Good Neighborliness which was concluded between France and Libya in 1955. Conversely, this gives Chad territorial sovereignty over the Aouzou Strip

See also
 Chadian–Libyan conflict

External links
The case documents on ICJ website

International Court of Justice cases
Territorial disputes of Chad
Territorial disputes of Libya
Chad–Libya border
1994 in case law
1994 in Chad
1994 in Libya
1994 in international relations